Ingrīda Verbele (born 18 January 1948) is a Latvian sprinter. She competed in the women's 400 metres at the 1968 Summer Olympics representing the Soviet Union.

References

1948 births
Living people
Athletes (track and field) at the 1968 Summer Olympics
Latvian female sprinters
Olympic athletes of the Soviet Union
Place of birth missing (living people)
Soviet female sprinters
Olympic female sprinters